Robert Spotts Graham (January 9, 1881 – July 6, 1967) was an American football player and coach. He served as the head football coach at Davidson College in Davidson, North Carolina for at least one season in 1907 and likely part of the previous season in 1906.

Grahamwas a 1902 graduate of Hampden–Sydney College and earned a law degree from the University of Virginia in 1906. The 1915 National Collegiate Athletic Association (NCAA) football guide listed him as a resident of Norton, Virginia and a registered referee.

Head coaching record

References

External links
 

1881 births
1967 deaths
Davidson Wildcats football coaches
Virginia Cavaliers football players
Hampden–Sydney College alumni
University of Virginia School of Law alumni
People from Tazewell County, Virginia
Players of American football from Virginia